Ljudmila Filimonova also written as Lyudmila Filimonova (Russian: Людмила Филимонова; born September 1962) is a former Soviet and Russian long track speed skater, who was active between 1980 and 1996.

Filimonova represented her nation at the European Speed Skating Championships for Women in 1989. In this championship she was doping tested and both the a- and b-test had a positive result for performance-enhancing drugs. Filimonova's results from the championship were therefore  disqualified. She was then banned for 15 months.

She also competed at other international competitions, including Dynamo Cups.

Between 1982 and 1997 she had a total of 19 starts at national championships. She won the silver medal at the 1991 Russian Single Distance Championships in the 1500 metres event and also the silver medal at the 1992 Russian Single Distance Championships in the 1500 metres event.

After her main career she was active as a master, and became two times master world champion.

Records

Personal records

References

External links
 

1962 births
Place of birth missing (living people)
Date of birth missing (living people)
Soviet female speed skaters
Russian female speed skaters
Doping cases in speed skating
Soviet sportspeople in doping cases
Living people